Karahasanlar is a village in the Yenipazar District, Bilecik Province, Turkey. Its population is 67 (2021).

See also
 Harmankaya Canyon Nature Park

References

Villages in Yenipazar District, Bilecik